The 1962 AFC Youth Championship was held in Bangkok, Thailand.

Teams
The following teams entered the tournament:

 
 
 
 
 
 
 
 
  (host)

Group stage

Group A

First-place play-off

Group B

Third place match

Final

External links
Results by RSSSF

AFC U-19 Championship
International association football competitions hosted by Thailand
1962 in Thai sport
1962 in Asian football
1962 in youth association football
April 1962 sports events in Thailand